The Wai-Coa-Bay Stallions were a rugby league team that represent the Upper Central Zone of the New Zealand Rugby League. The Zone comprises four districts: Waikato, Coastline Rugby League, Bay of Plenty, and Gisborne Tairawhiti Rugby League. The Stallions competed in the National Competition for the Albert Baskerville Trophy. The competition was re-organised in 2016 and the districts entered teams in their own right.

Because they represented a vast area, the Stallions had a number of home grounds, hosting games in Huntly, Rotorua and Tauranga in 2014. In 2014, the Stallions were promoted to the National Premiership Grand Final, losing to the Canterbury Bulls 40–8. It was the only time the Wai-Coa-Bay Stallions made a National Premiership Grand Final.

In the past, the Wai-Coa-Bay Stallions competed in the now defunct Bartercard Cup rugby league competition. The team was then split up into Waikato and Bay of Plenty when the Bartercard Premiership started in 2008.

Notable players

In their debut year they were coached by former international Tawera Nikau .

New Zealand Warriors assigned to the club included Lance Hohaia, Wairangi Koopu & Sam Rapira. The Stallions most notable local product was Isaac John.

History
The Stallions joined the competition in 2004, replacing the Taranaki Wildcats. They were not disgraced in their first year, performing well for a new club and securing four wins and two draws. However, in their second season they could only manage three wins and ended up collecting the Wooden Spoon. In 2006 they missed the finals again, finishing eighth out of ten teams. In the final year of the competition, 2007, they finished seventh. The Stallions finished 2nd= in 2015 only to have the senior team quashed by NZRL that sanctioned a new National competition for 2016. The Stallions still play as Wai-Coa-Bay in the U15s and U17s age groups that compete every year at the NZRL National Youth Tournament.

References

New Zealand rugby league teams
Rugby league in the Upper Central zone
Rugby clubs established in 2004
2004 establishments in New Zealand